The 1922 Louisville Brecks season was their second season in the league. The team improved on their previous output of 0–2, winning one game. They finished thirteenth in the league.

Schedule

Standings

References

Louisville Brecks and Colonels (NFL) seasons
Louisville Brecks
Louisville Brecks